Harmatitis sphecopa is a moth of the family Gelechiidae first described by Edward Meyrick in 1910. It is found in Sri Lanka.

References

Moths of Asia
Moths described in 1910